Joe Armstrong may refer to:
Joe Armstrong (football scout) (1894–1975), chief scout of Manchester United F.C. after World War II
Joe Armstrong (footballer) (born 1939), English footballer who played as an inside forward
Joe Armstrong (actor) (born 1978), English actor
Joe E. Armstrong (born 1956), American politician and member of the Tennessee House of Representatives
Joe Armstrong (programmer) (1950–2019), designer and implementer of Erlang programming language
Joe Lee Armstrong (born 1955), gospel singer
Joe Armstrong, character in American Ninja

See also
Joseph Armstrong (disambiguation)
Armstrong (surname)